Zopilote Machine is the debut studio album by the Mountain Goats. ("Zopilote" is Spanish for buzzard.) It is the only full album to include the entirety of The Bright Mountain Choir.

Track listing

Release history

Personnel
John Darnielle — vocals, guitar

The Bright Mountain Choir (Rachel Ware, Amy Piatt, Sarah Arslanian, Roseanne Lindley) — vocals

References

External links
Complete lyrics to the album

1994 debut albums
The Mountain Goats albums